St Leonards, an electoral district of the Legislative Assembly in the Australian state of New South Wales was created in 1894 and abolished in 1904.


Election results

Elections in the 1910s

1917

1913

1910

Elections in the 1900s

1907

1904

1901

Elections in the 1890s

1898

1895

1894

1891

Elections in the 1880s

1889

1887 by-election

1887

1885

1882

1880

Elections in the 1870s

1877

1874

1872

Elections in the 1860s

1869

1864

1860

1860 by-election

Elections in the 1850s

1859

References

New South Wales state electoral results by district